Lennoxville (Airview) Airport  was located  south of Lennoxville, Quebec, Canada.

References

Defunct airports in Quebec
Transport in Sherbrooke
Buildings and structures in Sherbrooke
Airports in Estrie